Dutton River is a rural locality in the Flinders Shire, Queensland, Australia.

Geography 
The Flinders River flows through from south-east to south-west. Dutton River (the watercourse) rises in the locality and forms part of the western boundary before flowing south-west to join the Flinders. The stream known as Stawell River or Cambridge Creek rises in the locality and flows west to the Woolgar River, a tributary of the Flinders.

The Flinders Highway passes briefly through the southern extremity of the locality.

History 
Jirandali (also known as Yirandali, Warungu, Yirandhali) is an Australian Aboriginal language of North-West Queensland, particularly the Hughenden area. The language region includes the local government area of the Shire of Flinders, including Dutton River, Flinders River, Mount Sturgeon, Caledonia, Richmond, Corfield, Winton, Torrens, Tower Hill, Landsborough Creek, Lammermoor Station, Hughenden, and Tangorin.

Dalleburra (also known as Dalebura, Dal-leyburra, Yirandali) is a language of North-West Queensland, particularly Lammermoor Station via Hughenden. The Dalleburra language region includes the local government boundaries of the Flinders Shire Council.

Dutton River State School opened on 24 January 1972 and closed on 6 June 1977.

Prior to 19 November 2021, the town of Marathon was within the locality of Stamford. However, this arrangement caused confusion, so on 19 November 2021, a new locality of Marathon was created around the town, excising the land from the localities of Dutton River and Stamford.

References 

Shire of Flinders (Queensland)
Localities in Queensland